Morgan Saint (real name Morgan Gildersleeve; born 1993 or 1994) is a singer-songwriter from Mattituck, New York. She is signed with Epic Records.

Her debut EP, 17 Hero, came out in 2017, and her second EP, Alien in 2018, both of which have received positive reviews, and "millions of streams"  Saint opened for Goldfrapp on their national tour.

In July 2020, Saint brought out the E.P. Help, "Her most personal project yet." “With the Title track HELP being featured in the Movie SONGBIRD featuring AJ Apa and Alexandra Daddario” 

She graduated from Parsons School of Design and majored in illustration.

References 

Living people
American women singer-songwriters
People from Suffolk County, New York
Epic Records artists
21st-century American women
Year of birth missing (living people)
Singer-songwriters from New York (state)